Lya W. Stern (born 1950) is a violinist, recording artist and violin teacher.  Born Lya Weiss to a Jewish family in Cluj, Romania, Stern moved to the United States as a teenager. She is married to Larry Stern and has two children.

Education
Stern completed post graduate studies in the violin at University of Southern CaliforniaThornton School of Music, and has a Master's Degree with Honors, Violin Performance from the University University of Southern California and a Bachelor's degree in Violin Performance from the Manhattan School of Music.

Stern was a resident, artist and teacher in New York City and Los Angeles. She currently lives in Washington, D.C. where she chairs the ASTA Certificate Advancement Program.

Teaching credits
 String Teacher of the Year 1999, American String Teachers Association MD/DC State Chapter
 Citation for Exceptional Leadership and Merit 2000, ASTA National
 Chair of the Maryland ASTA Certificate Advancement Program (ASTACAP) since 1998
 Founded the ASTA National Certificate Program for Strings for which she received the Outstanding Service For Strings Award in 1998.
  Past President of the MD/DC chapter of ASTA.
  Past Chair: MD State Solo Competition for Strings, ASTA; Brewster Competition for Strings, MD Music Teachers Assoc; Gretchen Hood Competition, Washington Music Teachers Assoc.
 Served as Adjudicator of competitions for the Washington Performing Arts Society, the Levine School of Music
 Past member of the faculty of the Baltimore School for the Arts

Artistic credits

Symphonic, opera and ballet 
National Gallery Orchestra, National Symphony Pops, Washington Bach Consort, Maryland Lyric Opera House, Paul Hill Chorale Orchestra, Alexandria Symphony, California Chamber Symphony, Roger Wagner Chorale and Simphonia, American Ballet Theatre, Bolshoi and Kirov Ballets
Nureyev and The Paris Opera Ballet, Dance Theatre of Harlem, Santa Monica Symphony, New American Orchestra,  Los Angeles Pops Orchestra, Pasadena Symphony, Glendale Symphony, San Fernando Valley Symphony, Westside Symphony, Westchester Symphony, Hollywood Chamber Orchestra

Feature films
Capricorn One, Star Trek, Grease, Rocky, New York, New York, A Star is Born, King Kong, Hook, Blues Brothers, Robin and Marian, The Domino Principle, Centennial, Beau Geste, The Buddy Holly Story, Back to the Future, The Muppet Movie, Ordinary People, The Hindenburg, The Greatest, Psycho II, Caddyshack, Dynasty, A Small Town in Texas, Trial of Billy Jack, Waiting to Exhale, etc.

TV films
Columbo, Little House on the Prairie, The Streets of San Francisco, Undersea World, Quincy, M.E., Hawaii Five-O, Marcus Welby, M.D., Name of the Game, Ironside, Barnaby Jones, Medical Center, Kojak, The Six Million Dollar Man, The Bionic Woman, Dallas

Musicals
Hello, Dolly!, Fiddler on the Roof, A Little Night Music, Chorus Line, Promenade, Lorelei, Irene, Gypsy, Evita

Writing
Publisher and editor:
Life At The End of the Tunnel

References
 ASTA Certificate Program For Strings
 The Science of Violin Playing, back cover
 Lya Stern YouTube Violin Channel

Notes

1950 births
Living people
Romanian Jews
Romanian emigrants to the United States
American violinists
Jewish American musicians
USC Thornton School of Music alumni
Manhattan School of Music alumni
Musicians from Cluj-Napoca
21st-century violinists
21st-century American Jews